Jürgen Pommerenke (born 22 January 1953 in Wegeleben) is a former German football midfielder and manager.

Pommerenke played his entire professional career for 1. FC Magdeburg, though he began his career as an youngster with BSG Traktor Wegeleben.

At international level, he received 53 caps for the East Germany national team, scoring three goals and was a participant at the 1974 FIFA World Cup. He earned an additional four caps for East Germany playing in the 1972 Summer Olympics, where he won a bronze medal.

In 1975, he won the award for the GDR Footballer of the Year.

References

External links

 Weltfussball 

1953 births
Living people
People from Harz (district)
German footballers
East German footballers
Footballers from Saxony-Anhalt
1974 FIFA World Cup players
Footballers at the 1972 Summer Olympics
Olympic footballers of East Germany
Olympic bronze medalists for East Germany
East Germany international footballers
1. FC Magdeburg players
1. FC Magdeburg managers
Olympic medalists in football
DDR-Oberliga players
Medalists at the 1972 Summer Olympics
Association football midfielders
German football managers
People from Bezirk Magdeburg